Masquerade is a 1965 British comedy thriller film directed by Basil Dearden based on the 1954 novel Castle Minerva by Victor Canning. It stars Cliff Robertson and Jack Hawkins and was filmed in Spain.

Plot
An Arab heir plots his own kidnapping in a desperate bid for peace in the Middle East.

Cast
 Cliff Robertson as David Frazer
 Jack Hawkins as Colonel Drexel
 Marisa Mell as Sophie
 Michel Piccoli as George Sarrassin
 Bill Fraser as Dunwoody
 Charles Gray as Benson  
 John Le Mesurier as Sir Robert  
 Felix Aylmer as Henrickson  
 Ernest Clark as Minister  
 Tutte Lemkow as Paviot  
 Keith Pyott as Gustave

Production
Rex Harrison was originally meant to star but he dropped out and Cliff Robertson was hired to replace him. The film was the first screen credit for novelist William Goldman who had been hired to Americanise the dialogue for Robertson (Robertson had just commissioned Goldman to adapt Flowers for Algernon into a screenplay).

Filming started on 3 June 1964 at Pinewood Studios under the title The Shabby Tiger. The unit then shifted to Madrid.

Robertson's work on the film meant he had to turn down an offered part in Judith.

References

External links

1965 films
British comedy films
1960s adventure films
Films based on British novels
Films directed by Basil Dearden
Films shot in Almería
Films with screenplays by Michael Relph
Films with screenplays by William Goldman
1960s English-language films
1960s British films